Members of Society Acting in Cooperation (MOSAIC), also known as MOSAIC Co-op, is a housing cooperative in Evanston, Illinois, United States. It is the only housing co-op serving Northwestern University students, though it is not affiliated with the university.

The co-op draws its membership from students of Northwestern as well as non-students. Members are committed to limiting environmental impact on the community and providing vegetarian/vegan cuisine. MOSAIC frequently hosts Northwestern student group activities, as well as its own events, such as open-mic nights and crafting workshops. The co-op currently states its mission as follows: "Through cooperative action, MOSAIC seeks to develop a diverse, inclusive community which inspires and empowers creative, conscious, sustainable living."

MOSAIC is a member of NASCO.

Mission & Purpose

Our mission is simple 
Through cooperative action, MOSAIC seeks to develop a diverse, inclusive community that inspires and empowers creative, conscious, sustainable living.

For almost 20 years, MOSAIC has sought to put our mission statement and our values into practice by providing housing with a focus on community, environmental sustainability, social consciousness, openness, and empowerment.

Community 
At its core, MOSAIC is all about community. Members share communal meals, participate in house meetings, and gather for events. We hang out together and support one another. Countless people have made lifelong friends (and even a few future spouses!) here. We strive to make our houses more than just a place to eat and sleep.

Living Consciously 
Many members are drawn to MOSAIC because it offers a space for “living consciously." This means different things to different people, but in general, we strive to be more intentional in how we relate to one another and to the world around us, and we work to be mindful of each other’s needs. We also challenge each other to recognize the social, environmental, economic, and political consequences of how we choose to live.

Additionally, as an organization committed to creating a living environment that is safe and nourishing for everyone, we strive to implement anti-oppressive practices within the co-op. We do not tolerate racism, sexism, homophobia, transphobia, ableism, or classism, and we do our best to make the co-op a space free from discrimination and oppression.

History

Back in '97 
The idea to start a co-op in Evanston was conceived by a small group of friends in 1997, who were frustrated by the lack of an off-campus community at nearby Northwestern University. Using a handbook they found online, the group recruited others to join their endeavor for “constructive inspiration, empowerment, and environmental conservation." The house on Ridge Avenue was founded, and in September of 1998 the first 12 co-op members moved in and began to organize a system in which to run the house.

After a year of trial and error, the co-op was successfully up and running, and ready to welcome new members for the following year. Membership grew steadily, prompting MOSAIC to expand in 2002. The organization's first apartment was maintained as an extension of the main house until summer 2003. During its last year spent at the Ridge location, MOSAIC housed almost 30 members.

Relocation & Expansion 
In June of 2004, MOSAIC relocated to 2000 Sherman Avenue, known as the Zooo. While the Zooo anchored MOSAIC for 12 years, attempts to expand the co-op between 2004-2014 were unsuccessful, with additional houses lasting a year or two at most. However, MOSAIC expanded to a second house at 1427 Elmwood Avenue in September of 2015: the Treehouse that still remains.

COVID-19 Impact 
As halves of an over 20 year old co-op, the Zooo and the Treehouse enjoyed the benefits provided by generations of members' hard work—years of members engaging in, maintaining, and continually bettering the processes that allow MOSAIC to function. Due to financial hardship as a result of the COVID-19 pandemic, the Zooo closed after 17 years in July 2021. The Treehouse continues to be the home for MOSAIC with 11 members and plans to soon own property as a long-term home for MOSAIC.

Plans for Growth & Expansion 
Over the years, MOSAIC has focused less on student housing and more on being an affordable housing resource for marginalized people who experience housing instability as many members and alumni share a variety of backgrounds and commitment to social justice.

MOSAIC's current focus is on having a strong sense of community, both with current members, alumni, as well as reaching out to outside nonprofits in partnership to help serve the community. From a complete overhaul of the organizational structure, to better training and education opportunity for members, we hope to uphold our mission and values of social justice in a way that makes an impact on those around us.

References

External links
MOSAIC Co-op website
North by Northwestern - Living by Consensus
Daily Northwestern - New building fosters same cooperative spirit
Daily Northwestern - Hip Living
North by Northwestern - MOSAIC interests community-minded students

Evanston, Illinois
Student housing cooperatives in the United States 
Residential buildings in Illinois